Meseret Belete Tola (born 16 September 1999) is an Ethiopian long-distance runner. She represented Ethiopia at the 2019 African Games in Rabat, Morocco and she won the bronze medal in the women's half marathon.

Career 

In 2018, she won the Gothenburg Half Marathon in Gothenburg, Sweden.

At the 2018 World Half Marathon Championships in Valencia, Spain she finished in 6th place in the women's individual race. In the team event, together with Netsanet Gudeta and Zeineba Yimer, she won the gold medal with a combined time of 3:22:27.

Achievements

References

External links 
 

Living people
1999 births
Place of birth missing (living people)
Ethiopian female long-distance runners
African Games bronze medalists for Ethiopia
African Games medalists in athletics (track and field)
Athletes (track and field) at the 2019 African Games
21st-century Ethiopian women